Bradley Norton (born February 13, 1975) is an American former professional ice hockey Defenseman. Norton played for five seasons in the National Hockey League (NHL).

Playing career
Norton started his professional career with the Detroit Vipers in the IHL in 1997. He was drafted in the 1993 NHL Entry Draft as the Edmonton Oilers' ninth-round pick, #215 overall. He has played a total of 124 NHL games with the Florida Panthers, Los Angeles Kings, Washington Capitals, Ottawa Senators and the Detroit Red Wings.

Norton signed with Jokerit in the Finnish SM-liiga. On December 15, 2006, he abruptly left the team to play in North America by invoking an NHL release clause in his contract. The Senators signed Norton to a one-year two-way deal on March 7, 2006. He gained viral video fame that year when his 16 April non-fight with Montreal Canadiens enforcer Aaron Downey. The two squared off with fists raised for forty seconds before being escorted to the penalty box without having thrown a punch or made contact in any way.

On June 23, 2006, Norton was signed by the Detroit Red Wings. He started the 2006–07 season, with the Red Wings, but injury struck and he was assigned to affiliate, the Grand Rapids Griffins, upon recovery.

Norton signed a one-year contract with the San Jose Sharks on July 18, 2007. Norton did not play a game with the Sharks as a back injury caused him to miss the season.

Personal life
He is the younger brother of former NHLer Jeff Norton, and is married to Playboy Radio afternoon advice show host Tiffany Granath. Norton was born in Cambridge, Massachusetts, attended Cushing Academy in Ashburnham, Massachusetts, but grew up in Acton, Massachusetts.

Career statistics

Awards and honours

References

External links

1975 births
American men's ice hockey defensemen
Binghamton Senators players
Detroit Red Wings players
Detroit Vipers players
Edmonton Oilers draft picks
Florida Panthers players
Grand Rapids Griffins players
Hamilton Bulldogs (AHL) players
Hershey Bears players
Ice hockey players from Massachusetts
Jokerit players
Living people
Los Angeles Kings players
Ottawa Senators players
People from Acton, Massachusetts
Sportspeople from Cambridge, Massachusetts
Sportspeople from Middlesex County, Massachusetts
UMass Minutemen ice hockey players
Washington Capitals players